Shri Vishwanath Mandir also known as Vishwanath Mandir, Vishwanath Temple, New Vishwanath Temple and Birla Temple is another prominent Hindu temple in the holy city of Varanasi. Hindus across India and abroad visit this particular Lord Shiva temple to offer prayer to the Lord Vishwanath for the well-being of their families, and eternal peace. Every hindu must perform a specific ritualistic homage for the departed souls of their ancestors this requires them to undertake pilgrimage to the holy city of Varanasi. The temple is situated near the Banaras Hindu University.Therefore the temple site and the neighbourhood is a major attraction among hindu students and visitors touring Varanasi.
Shri Vishwanath Mandir has the tallest temple tower in the world with the Shikhara's height being around 250 feet. The temple is colloquially called VT, an acronym of Vishwanath Temple.

History
Shri Kashi Vishwanath Mandir, was destroyed (and reconstructed) several times; in 1194 by Qutb-ud-din Aibak, between 1447 and 1458 by Hussain Shah Sharqi and then in 1669 CE by Aurangzeb. In 1930s, Pandit Madan Mohan Malaviya planned to replicate Shri Kashi Vishwanath Mandir in the campus of Benaras Hindu University. The Birla family undertook the construction and foundation was laid in March 1931. The temple (Shri Vishwanath Mandir) was finally completed in 1966.

Construction
Shri Vishwanath Mandir's construction took thirty-five years to complete (1931-1966). The temple is one of the tallest in India. Total height of the temple is approximately 77 meters. Temple's design was inspired by Shri Kashi Vishwanath Mandir and is made mostly of marble.

Though the Shri Vishwanath Mandir is primarily dedicated to Shiva, consists of nine shrines within one temple and is open to people from all castes, religions and religious beliefs. The Shiva shrine is in the ground floor and the Lakshmi Narayan and Durga shrines are on the first floor. Other shrines within Shri Vishwanath Mandir are Nataraj, Parvati, Ganesha, Panchmukhi Mahadev, Hanuman, Saraswati and Nandi. Entire text of Bhagavad Gita and extracts from sacred Hindu scriptures are inscribed with illustrations on the inner marble walls of the temple.

Location

Shri Vishwanath Mandir is situated 1.7 kilometers inside the campus of Benaras Hindu University (South-West from the main gate). It is 3.3 kilometers South-West of Durga Mandir, 7 kilometers South-West of Shri Kashi Vishwanath Temple and 9 kilometers South of Varanasi Railway Station.

Gallery

See also
Shri Kashi Vishwanath Mandir
Banaras Hindu University
List of Hindu temples in Varanasi

References

Hindu temples in Varanasi
Shiva temples in Varanasi
20th-century Hindu temples
Religious buildings and structures completed in 1966
20th-century architecture in India